Montanha is a Brazilian municipality in the state of Espírito Santo. Its population was 18,894 (2020) and its area is 1,099 km². In the Portuguese language, "montanha" means "mountain".

References

Municipalities in Espírito Santo